The siida is a Sámi local community that has existed from time immemorial. A siida, or 'reindeer pastoralistic district,' is a Sámi reindeer foraging area, a group for reindeer herding and a corporation working for the economic benefit of its members. The reindeer-herding siida has formed as an adaptation of ancient siida principles to large-scale nomadic reindeer herding. The pastoralist organisation differs slightly between countries, except in Russia, where kolkhoz replaced these earlier organisations.

General aspects
There are many other aspects of the siida system beyond land rights and resource management; for example, the transmission of traditional knowledge through siida practices and the siida's everyday dealings with the local environment. The use and protection of traditional Sámi reindeer-herding practices and knowledge are closely intertwined with the siida system, which is structured around the individuals; the husbandry units; the collective and the herding unit; the siida territory, resources, and infrastructure (/); and the semi-nomadic or nomadic lifestyle in accordance with the flow of the seasons.

Sweden
In Sweden, membership in a siida follows "pastoralist rights" based on statute of limitations, and is limited to individuals of Sámi descent. These rights also include hunting and fishing for profit. There are thirty-three mountain siidas, ten forest siidas and eight concession siidas, divided by historical extent, summer and winter pasture usage, etc. Membership is required to practice pastoralist rights. This is required for reindeer ownership as well, except in concession siidas, where even non-members can own "serve reindeers", served by siida members who receiving concession to pasture lands in payment. This custom originates in older conventions when reindeer were used by settled local populations in daily life. The economic activity in present-day siidas is limited to profit from pastoralist rights. In addition to the geographical and economic nature of the siida, it also ties the members together culturally and socially.

Based on historic Swedification policies that distinguished between settled and nomadic Sámi, membership in Swedish siidas is essentially limited to those whose ancestors were nomads before 1886, barring the majority of Swedish Sámi from membership in a siida.

Swedish sameby 
Mountain Sámi villages: Könkämä, Lainiovuoma, Saarivuoma, Talma, Gabna, Leavas, Girjas, Báste, Unna Tjerusj, Sirges, Jåkkåkaskatjiellde, Tuorpon, Luokta Mavas, Semisjaur-Njarg, Svaipa, Grans, Rans, Ubmeje tjeälddie, Vapstens, Vilhelmina norra, Vilhelmina södra, Frostvikens norra, Ohredahke, Raedtievaerie, Jiingevaerie, Jovnevaerie, Njaarke, Kall, Handölsdalens, Tåssåsens, Mittådalens, Ruvhten Sijte, and Idre

Forest Sámi villages: Vittangi, Gällivare, Serri, Udtja, Ståkke, Maskaur, Västra Kikkejaur, Östra Kikkejaur, Mausjaur, and Malå
  
Concession Sámi villages: Muonio, Sattajärvi, Tärendö, Korju, Pirttijärvi, Ängeså, Kalix, and Liehittäjä

Norway
In Norway, pastoralist activity requires membership in a unit, corresponding to a reindeer herd. The rights to conduct pastoralism are based on statute of limitations and limited to individuals of Sámi descent.

Still, it was not until 2007 that Sámi siidas were legally acknowledged by Norwegian authorities. Instead, the authorities maintained their own definitions of reindeer herding districts, leading to piecemeal development and sales of land, disconnecting traditional pasture areas. Because of this, the siida and traditional herding knowledge existed alongside, and often in conflict with, official regulations. The 2007 Reindeer Husbandry Act revised the official reindeer district system to acknowledge and incorporate traditional siida units, improving recognition of Sámi land rights and centering reindeer grazing activities on ecologically and economically sustainable resource use based on local culture and tradition.

Finland and Russia
In Finland and Russia, pastoralist activity is not limited to ethnic Sámi. In Finland, reindeer herding is also practiced by non-Sámi Finns. There are 56 s, of which 13 in the extreme north of Lapland constitute the Sámi area. However, reindeer herding has a more prominent economic role in the local communities of the north. Siidas are governed like stock companies, where the reindeer-holders elect a board of directors and a chief executive officer ('reindeer master') every three years, voting with as many votes as they have reindeer.

In Russia, Arctic peoples were forcibly relocated to kolchozes (collective communities) by the state between 1927 and 1940, including the Sámi of the Kola Peninsula. The Sámi were moved to kolchozes in the pogosts of Kamensky, Iokangsky, Kildinsky, Lovozersky, and Voronensk, and eventually two raion (administrative district) in Murmansk Oblast were designated as Sámi districts, Lovozersky District and Saamsky District.

References

Sámi-language terms
Sámi associations